The Hesselin Madonna (French - La Vierge Hesselin, La Vierge à l'enfant Hesselin or La Madone Hesselin) or Madonna of the Oak Cutting (La Vierge au rameau de chêne) is an oil on canvas painting produced by Simon Vouet for the Paris house of Louis XIII's secretary Louis Hesselin around 1640–1645. Its history between then and 1904, when it was exhibited in a gallery in London, is unknown. In 2004 it was bought for the Louvre in Paris.

Sources
http://www.latribunedelart.com/la-vierge-hesselin-de-simon-vouet-entre-au-louvre-grace-au-mecenat-d-entreprise

1640s paintings
Paintings of the Madonna and Child
Paintings in the Louvre by French artists
Paintings by Simon Vouet